The 1932 Washington gubernatorial election was held on November 8, 1932. Democratic nominee Clarence D. Martin defeated Republican nominee John Arthur Gellatly with 57.29% of the vote.

Primary elections
Primary elections were held on September 13, 1932.

Democratic primary

Candidates 
Clarence D. Martin, Mayor of Cheney
William Harrison Pemberton, former Associate Justice of the Washington Supreme Court
Lewis B. Schwellenbach, attorney
Frank R. Nicholas

Results

Republican primary

Candidates
John Arthur Gellatly, incumbent Lieutenant Governor
Roland H. Hartley, incumbent Governor
M.G. Tennent
Dell W. Thomas
Glen S. Corkery

Results

General election

Candidates
Major party candidates
Clarence D. Martin, Democratic
John Arthur Gellatly, Republican 

Other candidates
Luvern Clyde Hicks, Liberty
John F. McKay, Socialist
Fred E. Walker, Communist
Edward Kriz, Socialist Labor
Maslen Meade, Independent

Results

References

1932
Washington
Gubernatorial